Skachki platform was a railway platform located in St. Petersburg, Russia.

It was constructed in 1889 by the Joint-stock company of the Prinorskaya St.-Peterburg-Sestroretsk railway on the existing Ozerki line to serve the Hippodrome in Kolomyagi.

References

Railway stations in Saint Petersburg
Railway stations in the Russian Empire opened in 1889
Railway stations closed in 1927